DWCW (96.3 FM), broadcasting as Barangay LS 96.3, is a radio station owned and operated by GMA Network. The station's studio and transmitter are located at the 3rd. Level, A. Bichara Silverscreens Entertainment Center, Magallanes St. cor. T. Alonzo St., Brgy. Oro Site, Legazpi, Albay. It broadcasts from Monday to Saturday 4:00 AM to 12:00 MN and Sunday 4:00 AM to 11:00 PM.

References

External links
 

Barangay FM stations
Radio stations in Legazpi, Albay
Radio stations established in 1997